Second cabinet of Ivan Silayev was the last composition of the Council of Ministers of the Russian Soviet Federative Socialist Republic, working from July to November 1991. Most of its members kept their positions from the  Ivan Silayev's First Cabinet which was dissolved after Boris Yeltsin officially took office as president on 10 July 1991.

Composition

References

Sources 
 

Russian governments
Silayev
Silayev
Dissolution of the Soviet Union